The Democratic Alliance retained their position as official opposition in South Africa following the 2009 general elections and announced their shadow cabinet on May 15.

The Official Opposition Shadow Cabinet was led by Athol Trollip who succeeded Sandra Botha as the Democratic Alliance's parliamentary leader. Trollip represented party leader Helen Zille, who was serving as Premier of the Western Cape. The Shadow Cabinet included the Democratic Alliance's Federal Executive Chairperson James Selfe, former President of AgriSA Lourie Bosman, CODESA negotiator Dene Smuts, along with former Fulbright Scholars Sej Motau and Wilmot James, former Rhodes Scholar Gareth Morgan and Harvard Mason Fellow David Maynier.

The shadow cabinet was succeeded by the Shadow Cabinet of Lindiwe Mazibuko.

Official Opposition Shadow  Cabinet Team

Additional Members in Attendance

References 

South African shadow cabinets
Democratic Alliance (South Africa)